Marcella Filippi (born 27 September 1985) is an Italian basketball player. She competed in the 2020 Summer Olympics.

References

1985 births
Living people
Sportspeople from Bergamo
Italian women's basketball players
3x3 basketball players at the 2020 Summer Olympics
Olympic 3x3 basketball players of Italy
Italian women's 3x3 basketball players
21st-century Italian women